Profumo may refer to

People
 Albert Profumo (1879–1940), English barrister
 Alessandro Profumo (born 1957), Italian banker, CEO of Gruppo Unicredit
 David Profumo (born 1955), English novelist 
 Francesco Profumo (born 1953), Dean of the Engineering Faculty of the Politecnico di Torino
 John Profumo (1915–2006), British politician

Titles
 Baron Profumo of the Kingdom of Sardinia

Other
 Profumo (album), an album released by Italian singer Gianna Nannini in 1986.
 Profumo affair, 1963 British political scandal, relating to John Profumo (1915–2006).